The Uropeltoidea, also known as uropeltoid snakes, are a superfamily of snakes that contains uropeltids (family Uropeltidae) and Asian pipesnakes (families Cylindrophiidae and Anomochilidae).

As of 2018, Uropeltoidea contains 71 species, including the eponymous shield-tail snakes (genus Uropeltis with 23 species) and their relatives (32 species in 6 other genera), 13 species of Asian pipesnakes (genus Cylindrophis), and 3 species of dwarf pipesnakes (genus Anomochilus).

The taxonomy of boas, pythons, and other henophidian snakes has long been debated, and ultimately the decision whether to assign a particular clade to a particular Linnaean rank (such as a superfamily, family, or subfamily) is arbitrary. The clade name Uropeltoidea emphasizes the relatively close evolutionary relationship among these 71 species, which last shared a common ancestor about 48 [CI:36–60] million years ago, in contrast to the more distant relationship between uropeltoids and their next closest relatives, pythonoids (the most recent common ancestor between uropeltoids and pythonoids lived ~73 [CI:59–87] million years ago).

References

Alethinophidia

Taxa named by Johannes Peter Müller